Isabelle Yoffe Liberman (1918–1990) was an American psychologist, born in Latvia, who was an expert on reading disabilities, including dyslexia. Isabelle Liberman received her bachelor's degree from Vassar College and her doctorate from Yale University. She was a professor at the University of Connecticut from 1966 through 1987 and a research associate at the Haskins Laboratories.

Along with her husband, Alvin Liberman, she elucidated the "alphabetic principle" and its relationship to phonemic awareness and phonological awareness in reading. In 1988 she received the Samuel T. Orton Award of the Orton Dyslexic Society for contributing to wider understanding of reading disabilities. Her son Mark Liberman is Trustee Professor of Phonetics and Professor of Computer and Information Sciences at the University of Pennsylvania. Her son M. Charles Liberman is Professor of Otology and Laryngology at Harvard Medical School. Her daughter, Sarah Ash, is an Associate Professor of Nutrition in the Department of Food, Bioprocessing, and Nutrition Sciences at North Carolina State University.

Selected publications
 Susan A. Brady and Donald Shankweiler (eds.). (1991) Phonological Processes in Literacy: A Tribute To Isabelle Y. Liberman. Lawrence Erlbaum Associates. 1991
 Liberman, I. Y. (1973) Segmentation of the Spoken Word and Reading Acquisition. Bulletin of the Orton Society, XXIII, 65-77.
 Liberman, Isabelle Y., Donald Shankweiler, F. William Fischer and Bonnie Carter (1974). Explicit syllable and phoneme segmentation in the young child.  Journal of Experimental Child Psychology 18 (2), 201-212.      
 Liberman,  I.Y., Shankweiler, D., Camp, L., Blachman, B., & Werfelman, M. (1979). Steps toward literacy:  A linguistic approach. In Resnick  L., Weaver, P.(eds.): Theory and practice of early reading, Vol. 2. Hillsdale, NJ. Erlbaum Associates.
 Liberman, I., Liberman, A.M., Mattingly, I. & Shankweiler, D.  (1980).  Orthography and the Beginning Reader.  In J.F. Kavanagh & R.L. Venezky (eds.)  Orthography, Reading, and Dyslexia. University Park Press:  Baltimore. pp. 137–153.
 Liberman, I. Y. and Shankweiler, D. (1985) Phonology and the problems of learning to read and write. In Topical Issue (I. Y. Liberman, Guest Editor), Remedial and Special Education, 6(6), 8-17.
 Liberman, Isabelle Y. & Shankweiler, Donald. (1987) Phonology and the problems of learning to read and write. Memory and Learning Disabilities. Advances in Learning and Behavioral Disabilities, Suppl. 2, 203- 224.
 Liberman, I. Y. (1987) Language and Literacy: The Obligation of the Schools of Education. In W. Ellis (Ed.), Intimacy with language: A forgotten basic in teacher education. Baltimore: The Orton Dyslexia Society, 1-9.
 Liberman, I. Y., Shankweiler, D., & Liberman, A. M. (1990). The Alphabetic Principle and Learning to Read. In D. Shankweiler & I. Y. Liberman (Eds.), Phonology and Reading Disability: Solving the Reading Puzzle. (1989). IARLD Research Monograph Series. Ann Arbor: University of Michigan Press.

External links
 Haskins Laboratories bio
 New York Times Obituary

20th-century American psychologists
American women psychologists
Dyslexia researchers
Haskins Laboratories scientists
University of Connecticut faculty
Vassar College alumni
Yale University alumni
Latvian emigrants to the United States
1921 births
1990 deaths
20th-century American women
20th-century American people
American women academics